Bulge bracket banks are the world's largest multi-national investment banks, serving mostly large corporations, institutional investors and governments.  There is no definitive list of bulge bracket banks.

Overview 
Bulge bracket banks usually provide both advisory and financing banking services, as well as the sales, market making, and research on a broad array of financial products including equities, credit, rates, commodities and their derivatives.  They are also heavily involved in the invention of new financial products, such as mortgage-backed securities (MBS) in the 1980s, credit default swaps in the 1990s and collateralized debt obligations (CDO) in the 2000s and today, carbon emission trading and insurance-linked products.

Bulge bracket firms are usually primary dealers in US treasury securities.  Bulge bracket banks are also global in the sense that they have a strong presence in all four of the world's major regions: the Americas, Europe, the Middle East and Africa (EMEA) and Asia-Pacific (APAC).

The name comes from the way investment banks are listed on the "tombstone", or public notification of a financial transaction. The more important banks in a syndicate are listed first. The order is so important that, in 1987, five top investment banks withdrew from a syndicate underwriting a $2.4 billion debt issue for the Farmers Home Administration, because they would have been listed under other, smaller regional banks. There is often debate over which banks are considered to belong to the bulge bracket.  Membership implies prestige, but there are no precise criteria for inclusion and financial power is transient.  Various rankings are often cited, such as Thomson Reuters league tables, Bloomberg 20, or other league tables.

History
According to biographer Ron Chernow's 1990 book The House of Morgan, "in the late 1960s and early 1970s, the top tier—called the bulge bracket—consisted of Morgan Stanley; First Boston; Kuhn, Loeb; and Dillon, Read."  Morgan Stanley appeared above the other members of the bulge bracket by demanding and receiving the role of syndicate manager. While order within brackets was otherwise determined alphabetically, Chernow describes this positioning as being of "life-and-death" importance to the firms. Chernow says that Bache Halsey Stuart Shields Incorporated's name was chosen based on a desire to be placed as high as possible within its bracket.

According to Chernow, Morgan Stanley "queasily noted the rise of Salomon Brothers and Goldman Sachs, which were using their trading skills to chip away at the four dominant firms."  In 1975, to more reflect economic reality, Morgan Stanley removed Kuhn, Loeb and Dillon, Read, and replaced them with Merrill Lynch, Salomon Brothers and Goldman Sachs. Chernow describes' Morgan Stanley's place at the top of the bracket as a "gilded anachronism" by the late 1970s.

By the 1980s a revised bulge bracket had been defined.  The New York Times in 1987 reported that 

In the 1990s, the dominance of the bulge bracket firms was globalizing.  In 2001 The New York Times reported that "The real battle for the bulge bracket is taking place in Europe."

Modern list, post-COVID 
As of 2020, the Corporate Finance Institute, a Canadian financial analyst certification organization, as well as Wall Street Oasis, an online investment banking and finance forum, listed the following investment banks as bulge bracket banks:
 Bank of America
 Barclays
 Citigroup
 Credit Suisse
 Deutsche Bank
 Goldman Sachs
 JPMorgan Chase 
 Morgan Stanley
 UBS

Other uses
By extension, the international business world refers to service providers as "bulge bracket" such as "bulge bracket law firms" when they are capable of servicing global clients thanks to their global presence. Just like bulge bracket banks, bulge bracket service providers have a strong presence in all three of the world's major regions: the Americas, EMEA and Asia-Pacific.

See also 
 List of investment banks
 Primary dealer

References 

Investment banks